Lake Express High-Speed Ferry is an American company that operates a seasonal ferry service across Lake Michigan between Milwaukee, Wisconsin and Muskegon, Michigan. The Lake Express Milwaukee terminal and the company headquarters are located near the Port of Milwaukee.

History
Lake Express commenced operations on 1 June 2004. The service was the first regular ferry operation to connect Milwaukee and Muskegon since Milwaukee Clipper service had been discontinued in 1970.

Fleet
Lake Express operates one vessel with a capacity of 250 passengers and 46 vehicles.

Gallery

See also
HSC Lake Express

References

Bibliography

External links

Ferry companies of Michigan
Ferry companies of Wisconsin
Transportation in Milwaukee
Transportation in Muskegon County, Michigan